The Polish football champions are the annual winners of Poland's premier annual football competition.  The title has been contested since 1920 in varying forms of competition. From 1921 to 1926 the championship was decided in a series of tournaments until the league was formed in 1927. Since then the title was awarded the winners of the highest league in Polish football. In 1951 the title was awarded to the winner of the Polish Cup.

Pre-independence era (1913–1914) 
Before Poland regained its independence in 1918, Polish clubs had held their own championships in Austrian and Prussian partitions.

Galicia (Austrian partition) 
Competitions were organized by the original Polish Football Union, which was part of the Austrian Football Union.

Province of Posen (Prussian partition) 
Competions were organized by Association of Polish Sports Societies for the German Reich (now Greater Poland Football Association, a part of Polish Football Association).

Not to be confused with Posen Football Championship, the regional competition organized by South Eastern German Association, a part of German Football Association in 1908–1914.

Under German occupation (1941–1945)

List of champions

The performance of various clubs is shown in the following table:

Winning clubs

By number of championships 

Bold indicates clubs currently (as of the 2021–22 season) playing in the top division.Italics indicates clubs not existing anymore.

By voivodeship

By city

Honoured teams
After 10 Polish Championship titles a representative Golden Star is placed above the team's badge to indicate 10 Polish Championship titles. 
 
The current (as of July 2020) officially sanctioned Championship stars are:
Golden Star 10 or more Polish Championship titles:
 Ruch Chorzów
 Górnik Zabrze
 Wisła Kraków
 Legia Warsaw
Silver Star 5–9 Polish Championship titles:
 Lech Poznań
 Cracovia
White Star 1-4 Polish Championship titles
 Pogoń Lwów
 Warta Poznań
 Garbarnia Kraków
 Polonia Warsaw
 Polonia Bytom
 ŁKS Łódź
 Stal Mielec
 Śląsk Wrocław
 Szombierki Bytom
 Widzew Łódź
 Zagłębie Lubin
 Piast Gliwice

Statistics

At the end of 2021–22 Ekstraklasa.

Bold indicates clubs currently playing in the top division.Italics indicates clubs not existing anymore.

Source: 90minut

See also 
 Football in Poland
 Ekstraklasa
 Polish Cup
 Polish Super Cup
 Ekstraklasa Cup
 Sports in Poland

Notes

References

External links 
 List of Polish football champions 
 List of Polish football championships 

Football competitions in Poland
Poland